169 (one hundred [and] sixty-nine) is the natural number following 168 and preceding 170.

In mathematics
169 is an odd number, a composite number, and a deficient number.

169 is a square number: 13 × 13 = 169, and if each number is reversed the equation is still true: 31 × 31 = 961. 144 shares this property: 12 × 12 = 144, 21 × 21 = 441.

169 is one of the few squares to also be a centered hexagonal number. Like all odd squares, it is a centered octagonal number. 169 is an odd-indexed Pell number, thus it is also a Markov number, appearing in the solutions (2, 169, 985), (2, 29, 169), (29, 169, 14701), etc. 169 is the sum of seven consecutive primes: 13 + 17 + 19 + 23 + 29 + 31  + 37. 169 is a difference in consecutive cubes, equaling

In astronomy
 169 Zelia is a bright main belt asteroid
 Gliese 169 is an orange, main sequence (K7 V) star in the constellation Taurus
 QSO B0307+169 is a quasar in the constellation Aries
 Sayh al Uhaymir 169 is a 206g lunar meteorite found in Sultanate of Oman

In the military
  was a United States Navy technical research ship during the 1960s
  was a United States Navy  during World War II
  was a United States Navy  during World War II
  was a United States Navy  following World War I
  was a United States Navy  during World War II
  was a United States Navy submarine during World War II
 169th Battalion, CEF unit in the Canadian Expeditionary Force during the World War I
 169th Fires Brigade the US Army National Guard artillery brigade, a part of the Colorado Army National Guard
 The United States Air Force's 169th Fighter Wing fighter unit at McEntire Joint National Guard Station, South Carolina
 169 or 169th Squadrons
 169th Airlift Squadron, a unit of the U.S. Air Force
 Marine Light Attack Helicopter Squadron 169, United States Marine Corps Light Attack Helicopter Squadron
 No. 169 Squadron RAF, a unit of the United Kingdom Royal Air Force

In transportation
 Metro Transit Route 169 in Seattle
 169th Street was a station on the demolished IRT Third Avenue Line of the New York City Subway

In TV and radio
 The IEC 169-2 connector TV aerial plug

In other fields
169 is also:
 The year AD 169 or 169 BC
 The atomic number of an element temporarily called Unhexennium
 169 is the number of nonequivalent starting hands in the card game Texas hold 'em
 169 is known in the computing world as the first number of an automatic IPv4 address assigned by TCP/IP when no external networking device is contactable
 Minuscule 169 is a Greek minuscule manuscript of the New Testament, on parchment

See also
 List of highways numbered 169
 United States Supreme Court cases, Volume 169
 United Nations Security Council Resolution 169
 St. Joseph Community Consolidated School District 169

External links

 Number Facts and Trivia: 169
 The Positive Integer 169
 Prime curiosities: 169
 The Number 169
 VirtueScience: 169
 Number Gossip 169

References 

Integers